Nesheim may refer to:

Places
Nesheim, Voss, a village in Voss municipality in Vestland county, Norway
Nesheim, Rogaland, a village in Stavanger municipality in Rogaland county, Norway
Nesheim, Vaksdal, a village in Vaksdal municipality in Vestland county, Norway
Nesheim Church, a church in Vaksdal municipality in Vestland county, Norway
Nesheim Bridge, a bridge near McVille, North Dakota, United States

People
Asbjørn Nesheim, Norwegian linguist and curator known for his research on the Sámi languages and cultural history
Berit Nesheim, Norwegian film director
Daniel Te'o-Nesheim, American football defensive end
Helge Sverre Nesheim, Norwegian radio and television host
John Nesheim, American author and venture capitalist who teaches entrepreneurship at Cornell University
Robert Nesheim, American nutritionist who worked for Quaker Oats